Windows is a 30-minute American dramatic anthology television series.  Eight episodes aired live from New York City on CBS in 1955 as a summer replacement for Edward R. Murrow's Person to Person series.  Notable guest stars included Geraldine Page, Melvyn Douglas, Anthony Perkins, and Jason Robards.

It was produced by Mort Abrahams, and among its directors was Jack Garfein. Its writers included Ray Bradbury and Arnold Schulman.

External links

Windows (TV series) at CVTA with episode list

1950s American anthology television series
1955 American television series debuts
1955 American television series endings
CBS original programming
Black-and-white American television shows
American live television series